A plummet amulet is an amulet created by Ancient Egyptians in the shape of a plumb bob or plummet. 

They included these plummet amulets in the mummification process because they believed it would bring balance to the deceased in their next life.

References

External links

Egyptian amulets